Micronesian Americans are Americans who are descended from people of the Federated States of Micronesia. According to the 2010 census, a total of 8,185 residents self-identified as having origins in the country, which consists of four states. More than half of these residents identified their origin as Chuuk State (4,211) with the rest as follows: 2,060 people from Pohnpei, 1,018 from Yap, and 906 people from Kosrae.

History 

Beginning in the early 1970s when the Pell Grant was extended, several hundred people from Micronesia (including the country Micronesia and the other Micronesian island groups) emigrated yearly to the United States to attend college. By the late 1970s, many Micronesians were emigrating to Guam and the U.S. with the intention of establishing a permanent residence there. In 1980 U.S. several hundred people from the FSM were already residing in the U.S., with most of them being outer island Yapese. They did not want to return to their country and did not want to settle in Yap, where they lacked social status and where land was scarce.

In 1986, Micronesians obtained the right to live and work in the U.S. permanently, thanks to the Compact of Free Association covering the FSM, the Republic of the Marshall Islands (RMI), and the Republic of Palau. At first, the Micronesian emigrants to the U.S. under the compact were heavily Chuukese, with most of them settling in Guam and Saipan. When both of these islands experienced recession in the early 1990s, Micronesians increasingly headed for Hawaii. Micronesian migration to the U.S. increased significantly in the mid-1990s when compact funding for the FSM and the RMI decreased.

Demography 

In 2006, an article in the Micronesian Counselor estimated that over 30,000 Micronesian citizens were living in the United States and its territories. According to this source, one in four Micronesians were living in the U.S. or its territories. However, in the 2010 U.S. census, only 8,185 U.S. residents said they were descended from the FSM.

About 1,200 people migrate yearly from the FSM to the U.S. to seek work and give their children a better education.

Most US Micronesians live in the Pacific American Islands (Guam, Northern Mariana Islands and Hawaii). But also in southern California (such as San Diego or Pasadena), Portland (in Oregon; in this city live few thousand of Micronesians from entire area of Micronesia), Texas (Corsicana, being in mostly from Chuuk State), and Central Florida (where Micronesians, being in majority Pohnpeians, are scattered for an area that extends from Orlando to Tampa and Clearwater). Micronesians are also increasing rapidly in other places of the U.S. such as in Kansas City, Missouri, where the majority of the Micronesians are of Pohnpeian origin. So, communities of 4,000 to 5,000 Micronesian migrants live around Portland and Kansas City. Another large concentration of Micronesians is in southwest Missouri and northwest Arkansas. The Pohnpeian population (including outer islands which are part of the state of Pohnpei) in these areas has been estimated between 5,000 to 7,000. Evidence of the vast Pohnpeian population in this area can be seen at the yearly softball tournament held in Neosho, MO, which is also a sister city of Kolonia, Pohnpei. A few Marshallese also live in northwest Arkansas (numbered in the thousands). Small Micronesian communities also live in places such as Miami, Oklahoma, where live hundreds of Chuukese and Morristown, Tennessee with a rapidly growing population of over one thousand as of 2020.

The Micronesians living in the United States have created networks to unite all Micronesian families living in the areas in which they live and give him their support. This occurs in many parts of the country. Being mostly Protestant, networks generally rely on churches, that often profess the Protestant religion, however, these facilitates place heavy emphasize on the sports and recreation of its members rather than religious teachings. The relationship between the Micronesians in these networks makes life easier in the United States. In addition to Protestants there is a minority of Catholic Micronesians in the U.S. So, according to the Chuuk Reform Movement website (a Chuuk chain, whose aimed at improving the life of this ethnic group in the United States), in May 2009 was ordained a priest of permanent way the Father Bruce Roby, in the Diocese of Bridgeport, Connecticut, being the first Catholic priest from the FSM on permanent assignment in the United States.

Organizations 
Many Micronesians live in southern California, where they have, at least, an association: The Micronesian Association of Southern California (Mascal), located in San Diego, to foster the relationship between the Micronesians residing in the United States. Furthermore, the association promotes educational opportunities, "career development"  and establish some programs designed for promote the social awareness and services for its members.

Notable people 
 Keitani Graham, Greco-Roman wrestler
 Emelihter Kihleng, poet

References 

American people of Federated States of Micronesia descent
Micronesian American
Oceanian American
Pacific Islands American